Acacia fauntleroyi is a shrub or small tree belonging to the genus Acacia and the subgenus Juliflorae that is endemic to a part of south western Australia.

Description
The silvery coloured branchlets have small silky hairs. The silvery to grey-green phyllodes have a linear to shallowly incurved shape. The simple inflorescences occur singly or in pairs in the axils. The obloid to cylindrical shaped flower-heads contain 43 to 49 golden coloured flowers. The linear brown seed pods that form after flowering are raised over the seeds.

Distribution
It is native to an area in the Wheatbelt region of Western Australia where it is found among granite outcrops and boulders growing in pockets of sandy loamy soils. It is found from around Wongan Hills in the north west to Hyden in the south east where it is a part of scrubland communities.

See also
List of Acacia species

References

fauntleroyi
Acacias of Western Australia
Taxa named by William Blakely
Taxa named by Joseph Maiden
Plants described in 1928